EssilorLuxottica SA is a French vertically integrated multinational corporation based in Paris and founded on 1 October 2018 from the merger of the Italian Luxottica with the French Essilor. The group designs, produces and markets ophthalmic lenses, optical equipment, prescription glasses and sunglasses. The company has a portfolio of proprietary and licensed brands including Ray-Ban, Oakley, Michael Kors, Varilux, Crizal, Transitions and LensCrafters. EssilorLuxottica is currently a global leader in the design, production and sale of ophthalmic lenses and frames.

The company has €14.4 billion in revenues and €38.2 billion capitalization.

The company is listed on the Euronext Paris stock exchange under the trading symbol EL and is part of the CAC 40 share index which includes the 40 largest capitalized companies traded on the Paris Stock Exchange and the Euro Stoxx 50 which includes the 50 largest companies in the Eurozone.

Market dominance 
The company dominates the global eyewear market as the largest single player in that market.

They own the following companies: Clearly (Clearly.ca/Coastal.com), Eyebuydirect, FramesDirect.com, LensCrafters, OPSM, Pearle Vision, Sears Optical, Sunglass Hut, Target Optical, Vision Direct, Vision Source, and more. The company has been accused of being a borderline monopoly by using their market dominance to unfairly increase the cost of their products. This predatory behavior was a subject in the episode "Adam Ruins Malls," from the series Adam Ruins Everything.

Combination of Essilor and Luxottica 
In January 2017, Essilor and Luxottica announced the merger of their activities. After having received the necessary authorizations from the competition authorities of the United States, the European Union, Brazil, Canada and China, EssilorLuxottica was created on 1 October 2018.

This merger gives birth to a giant of the optical industry, generating a turnover of more than 16 billion euros and a market capitalization of 57 billion euros.

This merger was achieved by changing Essilor's corporate name to EssilorLuxottica and launching a public exchange offer.

Delfin S.a.r.l. (a company controlled by Leonardo Del Vecchio, former majority shareholder of Luxottica) then held 62.42% of Luxottica, a share that it contributed to EssilorLuxotica. Delfin also became the main shareholder of the new group with 38.9% of the capital.

Brands 
According to its website, it owns the following lens technologies:

 Crizal
 Essilor
 Essilor Sun Solution
 Eyezen
 Kodak
 Oakley
 Optifog
 Ray-Ban
 Transitions
 Varilux
 Xperio

And the following eyewear brands:

 Alain Mikli
 Armani Exchange
 Arnette
 Barberini
 Bolon
 Brooks Brothers
 burberry
 Bvlgari
 Chanel
 Coach
 Costa
 Dolce&Gabbana
 Emporio Armani
 Ferrari
 Foster Grant
 Giorgio Armani
 Luxottica
 Michael Kors
 Miu Miu
 Molsion
 Oakley
 Oliver Peoples
 Persol
 Polo Ralph Lauren
 Prada
 Ralph Lauren
 Ray-Ban
 sferoflex
 Starck Eyes
 Tiffany & Co.
 Tory Burch
 Valentino
 Versace

References

External links 
 

 
Medical technology companies of France
Companies listed on Euronext Paris
Companies in the Euro Stoxx 50
CAC 40
Multinational companies headquartered in France
Manufacturing companies established in 2018
Eyewear companies of France
Eyewear retailers of France
French brands
Lens manufacturers
Optics manufacturing companies
French companies established in 2018
Manufacturing companies based in Paris